Ouija is a 2003 horror film set in Barcelona, Spain. A group of friends play with an Ouija board and make contact with spirits. Produced by Eleven Dreams, S.L.U.

External links
 

2003 films
2003 horror films